Beckley Club Estates is a neighborhood in Dallas, Texas.  The area is composed of bungalow style houses built in the 1920s and 1950s. The area's boundaries consist of North Shore to the north, Beckley to the west, Arizona Ave. to the East and Iowa Ave. to the south. The area is one of the quickest appreciating areas in the 75216 zip code.

Peacocks 

Beckley Club Estates is home to an ostentation of about 40 peacocks. The neighborhood received international media coverage in 2015 when one of the peacocks was stolen and later returned.

External links 
Map: 

Neighborhoods in Oak Cliff, Dallas
Neighborhoods in Dallas